Osinsky or Osinski (masculine), Osinskaya (feminine), or Osinskoye (neuter) may refer to:

Places
 Osinsky District, Irkutsk Oblast
 Osinsky District, Perm Krai
 Osinskoye Urban Settlement, a municipal division

People
 Christine Osinski (born 1948), American photographer
 Marek Osinski, American engineer
 Moshe Osinsky, birth name of Montague Burton, British businessperson
 Valerian Osinsky (1887–1938), Russian Bolshevik revolutionary
 Stanislav Ossinskiy (born 1984), Olympic swimmer from Kazakhstan
 Osiński, a Polish-language version of the surname

See also
 Ozinsky District, Saratov Oblast, Russia

Russian-language surnames